The fifth season of the television sitcom Brooklyn Nine-Nine premiered September 26, 2017 on Fox. This was the final season to air on Fox, as the series was cancelled on May 10, 2018, before NBC picked it up for a sixth season the next day.

Summary
Jake and Rosa adjust to life in jail before the Nine-Nine are able to bust Melanie Hawkins when Holt is forced to make a deal with local mobster Seamus Murphy. After their release, Jake realizes he's not ready to be back out in the field right away and Rosa breaks up with Adrian. During the fifth annual Halloween heist, Jake proposes to Amy and they get engaged. On a trip to Los Angeles for the funeral of the Nine-Nine's previous captain, Holt learns he's in the running to become the new police commissioner and the crew vows to help him deal with Murphy. Rosa comes out as bisexual. Gina returns to the Nine-Nine after spending months on maternity leave. Though the crew successfully finds a loophole that allows Holt to keep up his deal with Murphy without jeopardizing his moral code, Murphy finds out about their ruse and threatens Kevin's life.

Kevin is forced to remain in a safe house with Jake for two months to avoid detection from Murphy. After the Nine-Nine successfully locates Murphy's hideout, Kevin takes down Murphy and the mobster and his men are successfully apprehended. Charles attempts to run his own food truck business. Amy passes the Sergeant's Exam. After their wedding plans fall apart from a bomb threat, Jake and Amy get married outside of the precinct. The season ends at the after-party of their wedding where the squad is unsure whether Holt won the Commissioner title or not.

Cast

Main
 Andy Samberg as Jake Peralta
 Stephanie Beatriz as Rosa Diaz
 Terry Crews as Terry Jeffords
 Melissa Fumero as Amy Santiago
 Joe Lo Truglio as Charles Boyle
 Chelsea Peretti as Gina Linetti
 Andre Braugher as Raymond Holt

Starring
 Dirk Blocker as Michael Hitchcock
 Joel McKinnon Miller as Norm Scully

Recurring
 Gina Gershon as Lt. Melanie Hawkins
 Tim Meadows as Caleb
 Lou Diamond Phillips as Jeff Romero
 Paul Adelstein as Seamus Murphy
 Craig Robinson as Doug Judy
 Jason Mantzoukas as Adrian Pimento
 Marc Evan Jackson as Kevin Cozner
 Kevin Dorff as Hank
 Winston Story as Bill

Guest

 Dean Winters as Detective Keith "The Vulture" Pembroke
 Bradley Whitford as Captain Roger Peralta
 Katey Sagal as Karen Peralta
 Jimmy Smits as Victor Santiago
 Bertila Damas as Camila Santiago
 Danny Trejo as Oscar Diaz
 Olga Merediz as Julia Diaz
 Fred Melamed as DC Parlov
 Maria Thayer as Jean Munhroe
 Rob Huebel as Landon Lawson
 Reggie Lee as Dr. Ronald Yee
 Mike Mitchell as Kyle Murphy
 Sterling K. Brown as Philip Davidson
 Allison Tolman as Capt. Olivia Crawford
 David Fumero as Vin Stermley
 Drew Tarver as Officer Gary Jennings
 Jay Chandrasekhar as himself
 Nasim Pedrad as Katie Peralta
 Reginald VelJohnson as himself
 Akiva Schaffer as Brett Booth
 Kyle Bornheimer as Sergeant Teddy Wells
 Gina Rodriguez as Alicia

Episodes

Reception

Ratings

Critical response
The fifth season received critical acclaim from audiences and critics, who praised the chemistry, humor, prison arc, performances, and writing, with many calling it a heartwarming ending to the Fox era of the show and some calling it one of the best seasons of the show. The review aggregator website Rotten Tomatoes reports a 100% approval rating, with an average score of 8.5/10, based on 14 reviews. The website's consensus reads, "Brooklyn Nine-Nines final year with Fox pops with such joyous affection that it could have been a satisfying closer for the series, but the ensemble's unflappable chemistry continues to gel so well that viewers will be glad that these cops will live to fight crime again."

References

External links

  at Fox
 

 
2017 American television seasons
2018 American television seasons
Brooklyn Nine-Nine